"Sorrento Moon (I Remember)" is a song written by Australian singer Tina Arena, David Tyson, and Christopher Ward for Arena's second album, Don't Ask (1994). The song is about Arena's childhood memories of summers past with her family at Sorrento in Victoria, Australia. It was produced by Tyson and released as the album's second single in Australia on 16 January 1995. The song also reached the top 40 in New Zealand and the United Kingdom. The accompanying music video was partly shot at Sorrento back-beach.

The song is lyrically referred to in Client Liaison's 2017 single "A Foreign Affair", featuring Arena.

Critical reception
AllMusic editor Kelvin Hayes complimented the song as "gorgeous", adding that it "suggests Arena may yet become the Astrud Gilberto of Australia." James Richliano from The Boston Globe wrote in his review of the Don't Ask album, "The sweet innocence is most prominent on "Sorrento Moon (I Remember)", an uptempo gem steeped in breezy calypso rhythms". British newspaper The Guardian described it as "delicate", while a reviewer from People Magazine noted its "samba flavor".

Track listings
 Australian CD single
 "Sorrento Moon (I Remember)"
 "Greatest Gift" (Live)
 "Many Rivers To Cross" (Live)
 "Sorrento Moon (I Remember)" – Radio Edit

 UK CD single
 "Sorrento Moon (I Remember)" – Radio Version
 "Sorrento Moon (I Remember)" – Spanish Version
 "Thats The Way A Woman Feels" – The New Horns Mix
 "Wasn't It Good" – Live Solo Version

 Austrian CD single
 "Sorrento Moon (I Remember)" – Radio Version
 "Chains" – Unchained Vox Dub
 "Chains" – S&M Mix

Charts

Weekly charts

Year-end charts

Certifications

Release history

References

Tina Arena songs
1994 songs
1995 singles
Songs written by Christopher Ward (songwriter)
Songs written by David Tyson
Songs written by Tina Arena